Callopatiria is a genus of starfish of the family Asterinidae.

Characteristics
Members of the genus Callopatiria have five long, narrow rays, rounded on the upper surface and tapering to a rounded tip. The body is flat on the oral (under) surface but convex on the aboral (upper) surface. The plates on the rays are irregular and are covered by numerous glassy spinelets, finger-like on the primary plates and narrowly conical on the secondary plates. No pedicellariae are present and the papular spaces are large with numerous papulae.

Species
 Callopatiria cabrinovici O'Loughlin, 2009
 Callopatiria formosa (Mortensen, 1933)
 Callopatiria granifera (Gray, 1847)

References

Asterinidae